Pocs, POCs or POCS may refer to:
 Pócs, the taxonomic author abbreviation for Hungarian botanist Tamás Pócs (born 1933)
 Éva Pócs (born 1936), Hungarian anthropologist
 Palace of Culture and Science, Warsaw, tallest building in Poland and an icon of Warsaw
 Piner Olivet Charter School, school in California, United States
 Posterior Circulation Stroke Syndrome (POCS), related to Posterior circulation infarct
 Projections onto convex sets (POCS), see (e.g.) Numerical Recipes, Section 19.5.2
Persons/ People of Colour(s)